Mozart  is a 1955 Austrian drama film directed by Karl Hartl and starring Oskar Werner, Johanna Matz and Gertrud Kückelmann. It is also known by the alternative title The Life and Loves of Mozart. It was entered into the 1956 Cannes Film Festival. The plot explores the mental state of Mozart during production of his final opera The Magic Flute. Werner's portrayal of Mozart was unusual for the time in playing him as a cheerful and easygoing young man, reflecting the postwar optimism of the newly restored Austrian Republic.

The film's sets were designed by the art directors Werner Schlichting and Wolf Witzemann.

Cast
Oskar Werner as Wolfgang Amadeus Mozart
Johanna Matz as Annie Gottlieb
Erich Kunz as Emanuel Schikaneder
Gertrud Kückelmann as Constanze Mozart
Nadja Tiller as Louise Weber Lange
Annie Rosar as Frau Weber
Hugo Gottschlich as Don Primus
Angelika Hauff as Suzi Gerl
Albin Skoda as Antonio Salieri, village composer 
Raoul Aslan as Rosenberg, Hofkämmerer 
Walter Regelsberger as Süßmayer, Mazart's Famulus
Elfie Weissenböck as Josefa Hofer - Queen of the Night
Alma Seidler as Gottlieb's mother
Ulrich Bettac as Gottlieb's father
Leopold Rudolf as an unknown person, orderer of the Requiem
Helli Servi as Lina, Mozart's servant
Raoul Retzer as Gerl, Sarasto's actor
Elisabeth Terval as Eleonore Gottlieb
Egon von Jordan as Bondini, ital. Impresario
Fred Hennings as Van Swieten
Franz Böheim as stage manager of the theatre
Peter Brand as Schack, Taminos' actor
Karl Eidlitz as Hoffmeister, Musikallienhändler
Karl Skraup as Valentin

References

External links

1950s historical drama films
1955 drama films
Austrian historical drama films
Films directed by Karl Hartl
Films about classical music and musicians
Films about composers
Biographical films about musicians
Films about Wolfgang Amadeus Mozart
Cultural depictions of Antonio Salieri
Films set in Vienna
Films set in the 18th century